The November 2011 Bering Sea cyclone was one of the most powerful extratropical cyclones to affect Alaska on record. On November 8, the National Weather Service (NWS) began issuing severe weather warnings, saying that this was a near-record (or record) storm in the Bering Sea. The storm had been deemed life-threatening by many people. The storm had a forward speed of at least  before it had reached Alaska. The storm began affecting Alaska in the late hours of November 8, 2011. One person was reported missing after being swept into the Bering Sea, and he was later pronounced dead.

Meteorological synopsis

In early November 2011, an extratropical cyclone developed over the western Pacific Ocean. Though still intensifying, winds associated with the storm were already estimated in excess of hurricane-force. By 9:00 p.m. AKST, the system had attained a pressure of around 943 mbar (hPa; 27.85 inHg) while it was near the Gulf of Anadyr. This made it one of the most powerful storms on record in the region, comparable to the November 1974 storm in Nome, Alaska, which was regarded as "the most severe in Nome in 113 years of record keeping." After weakening somewhat, the storm crossed the Chukotsk Peninsula around 9:00 a.m. AKST on November 9 before moving over the Chukchi Sea later that day.

Preparations 
On November 7 and 8, the NWS issued hurricane wind warnings, flood warnings and blizzard warnings for most of Western Alaska. The storm came after almost 7,000 people in the Kenai Peninsula lost power in a previous storm the week before. An Alaskan village called Kivalina built a wall to protect waves from flooding the village. The storm was expected to test the walls sturdiness. In case the wall fell down, people who live in Kivalina would be evacuated. Storm surges were expected to be up to 8–10 feet. The U.S. Coast Guard staged helicopters around the western coast of Alaska in case of any emergencies. People in Unalakleet, Alaska began to board up their windows on November 8. The Alaskan Homeland Security helped villages prepare for the storm.

Impact 
From November 8, temperatures around Alaska began decreasing. Many low-lying areas experienced flooding, including Nome.

The Cape Nome Jetty sustained approximately $500,000 in damage. Although the surge did not over-top the seawall, water from breaking waves washed over and inundated a sewer and water treatment plant. The pumps at the facility were overwhelmed and 165,000 gallons of raw wastewater was discharged into a small harbor. Several other buildings in the area had basement flooding but no significant losses took place. A significant portion of the Nome-Council road was washed out or severely damaged by the storm, and damage was estimated at $24 million. Coastal damage throughout the city of Nome was estimated at $80,000.

The storm caused widespread damage to approximately 37 communities on the Western Alaskan coast. Damage included coastal erosion caused by storm surge, roof and other structural damage to homes and businesses, and loss of heat and electricity.

A fishing vessel was lost in the severe weather after the crew was ordered to abandon ship. The crew was rescued by the United States Coast Guard.

Aftermath 
Forecasters at the NWS predicted a second strong storm; however, the forecasted storm was not expected to cause as much damage. Other low-pressure areas spawned by this storm were expected to bring heavy rain to British Columbia and the West Coast of the United States. On November 11, 2011, the National Weather Service issued hurricane-force wind warnings and storm warnings for Western Alaska with coastal flood warnings for the Alaska Peninsula.

On December 22, President Barack Obama issued a disaster declaration due to the large amount of destruction caused by the storm.

Other notable storms in the Bering Sea
Storms analysed below  by the National Weather Service occur on average 5 times per year in the Bering Sea area, where one or two per year see their central pressure drop below . 2011 also saw a low pressure reach  on April 6, however this storm was less damaging as the wind-field was strongest out to sea.
November 2014: An extratropical cyclone that absorbed the remnants of Typhoon Nuri intensified to a minimum central pressure of 920 millibars (mbar), while meteorologists in the United States estimated its minimum pressure to be 924 millibars.
September 2005 and October 2004: Two powerful extratropical storms brought high storm surges to the Alaskan coast.
October 25–26, 1977: Saw what has been described as the most powerful storm in Alaska in modern times, until it was eclipsed by the November 2014 Bering Sea bomb cyclone. The storm had its origins as a West Pacific Typhoon.
December 7, 1950: Saw the strongest wind gust ever recorded in Alaska, with a maximum gust of  measured at Attu in the far west Aleutian Islands.

Strong Bering Sea storms affecting Alaska typically form as East Asian-northwest Pacific storms, as cold, dry air masses from Siberia meet with mild and moist sub-tropical air masses off the coast of Japan where they can rapidly deepen above the Kuroshio Current, before heading towards Alaska. These storms develop in a similar manner to the formation of extratropical cyclones in the North Atlantic, although they tend not to reach the absolute low pressures recorded there, such as  during the Braer Storm of January 1993.

See also

Explosive cyclogenesis
Great Gale of 1880
Columbus Day Storm of 1962
January 2013 Northwest Pacific cyclone
November 2014 Bering Sea cyclone
Great Arctic Cyclone of 2012
Typhoon Merbok (2022)

References 

2011 Bering
Bering
Bering
Cyclone,2011-11-04,Bering
Bering
Bering
Bering Sea cyclone
Cyclone,2011-11-04,Bering
November 2011 events in the United States